The 53rd Academy Awards ceremony, organized by the Academy of Motion Picture Arts and Sciences (AMPAS), honored films released in 1980 and took place on March 31, 1981, at the Dorothy Chandler Pavilion in Los Angeles beginning at 7:00 p.m. PST / 10:00 p.m. EST. The ceremony was scheduled to take place originally on the previous day but was postponed due to the attempted assassination of Ronald Reagan. During the ceremony, AMPAS presented Academy Awards (commonly referred to as Oscars) in 20 categories. The ceremony, televised in the United States by ABC, was produced by Norman Jewison and directed by Marty Pasetta. Comedian and talk show host Johnny Carson hosted the show for the third consecutive time. Two weeks earlier, in a ceremony held at The Beverly Hilton in Beverly Hills, California, on March 15, the Academy Scientific and Technical Awards were presented by hosts Ed Asner and Fay Kanin.

Ordinary People won four awards, including Best Picture. Other winners included Tess with three awards, The Empire Strikes Back, Fame, Melvin and Howard, and Raging Bull with two, and Coal Miner's Daughter, The Dollar Bottom, The Fly, From Mao to Mozart: Isaac Stern in China, Karl Hess: Toward Liberty, and Moscow Does Not Believe in Tears with one. The telecast garnered 39.9 million viewers in the United States.

Winners and nominees
The nominees for the 53rd Academy Awards were announced on February 17, 1981, by Academy president Fay Kanin and actor William Devane. The Elephant Man and Raging Bull tied for the most nominations with eight each.  The winners were announced at the awards ceremony on March 31. Best Director winner Robert Redford became the third individual to win this category for his directing debut and the first actor to achieve this feat. At age 20, Best Supporting Actor winner Timothy Hutton was the youngest male acting winner in Oscar history. Fame became the first film to earn two nominations for Best Original Song. After failing to recognize The Elephant Man (film)'s makeup & hairstyling, the makeup category was created the following year.

Awards

Winners are listed first, highlighted in boldface and indicated with a double dagger.

Academy Honorary Award
 Henry Fonda  "In recognition of his brilliant accomplishments and enduring contribution to the art of motion pictures."

Special Achievement Award
 Brian Johnson, Richard Edlund, Dennis Muren and Bruce Nicholson for the visual effects of The Empire Strikes Back

Multiple nominations and awards

Presenters and performers
The following individuals, listed in order of appearance, presented awards or performed musical numbers.

Presenters

Performers

Ceremony information

In December 1980, the Academy hired film producer Norman Jewison to produce the telecast for the first time. "I am delighted that the Academy will have the benefit of Norman Jewison's insight and creativity," said AMPAS President Fay Kanin in a press release announcing the selection. "He has always been able to bring a fresh approach into his work." That same month, it was announced that comedian and The Tonight Show host Johnny Carson would preside over emceeing duties for the 1981 ceremony. Jewison explained the decision to hire Carson saying that the host was "an entertainment institution whose spontaneous wit and charm would add a great deal to the quality of the show."

Originally the gala was scheduled to take place on March 30. However, due to the attempted assassination on US president Ronald Reagan which occurred earlier that day, Kanin, Jewison, and executives from broadcaster ABC announced that the festivities would be postponed to the following day. It marked the first time since the 40th ceremony held in 1968 that the ceremony was postponed from its original date. Furthermore, producers debated whether or not to televise a pre-recorded speech from Reagan, who was a former actor,  saluting the nominees and the Academy. The segment, which was filmed nearly four weeks prior to the show, was eventually broadcast with host Carson giving a preface explaining the decision to postpone the event.

The Fly acceptance speech
During the presentation of the award for Best Animated Short Film to The Fly, presenters Alan Arkin and Margot Kidder announced that the film's director Ferenc Rofusz was unable to attend the ceremony. Just as they announced the Academy would accept the award on his behalf, an unnamed man later identified as Hungarofilm general manager Istvan Dosai came up on stage and accepted the award in lieu of the absent filmmaker. Marble Arch Films publicist Regina Gruss, who was in charge of hosting the Hungarian delegation at the Oscars, said that Rofusz contacted Dosai to accept the award on his behalf, but Academy officials asked him not to come up onstage unless his name was announced. After speaking to reporters and posing for pictures backstage, he never returned to his seat and left the ceremony immediately. According to Academy security chief Jerry Moon, AMPAS contacted the LAPD to issue a search warrant for Dosai for theft. However, Academy spokesperson Art Sarno denied the organization had contacted the police and said that Dosai returned the statuette during a post-awards banquet.

Critical reviews
Some media outlets received the broadcast critically. Television columnist Tom Shales of The Washington Post commented, "Everything seemed an anticlimax to the Reagan opening, and the tragic events in Washington a day earlier did put a shadow of gloom over an affair that had promised to be grim enough anyway – since all but one of the year's Best Picture nominees were somber, austere films, and nothing to shout about." The Salt Lake Tribune television critic Harold Schindler wrote, "On the whole, the 53rd annual Academy Awards telecast Tuesday was overly long, expectedly dull and surprisingly lacking in those highlights which make Oscar night conversation." Bill Mandel of the San Francisco Examiner quipped, "After the real and completely unscripted emotional explosions of Monday, all the manipulated thrills of the movie industry seemed like the efforts of those bullfight clowns who distract the bull when the matador is injured."

Other media outlets received the broadcast more positively. Tampa Bay Times film critic Robert Alan Ross remarked, "The one-day delay turned out well. President Reagan's taped greeting – combined with emcee Johnny Carson's assurance that the First Couple were comfortably watching – instilled a happier mood than might otherwise have prevailed." Jerry Buck of the Associated Press quipped, "Producer Norman Jewison effectively chose to make the night a homage to motion pictures' past, making wide use of many cherished film clips that tugged at the heart and memory." The Boston Globe columnist Bruce McCabe wrote, "Given the trauma of the past few days, the Academy Awards show conducted itself rather well. No one really disgraced himself. There were no political speeches."

Ratings and reception
The American telecast on ABC drew in an average of 39.9 million people over the length of the entire ceremony, which was a 19% decrease from the previous year's ceremony. An estimated 75 million total viewers watched all or part of the awards. Moreover, the show drew lower Nielsen ratings compared to the previous ceremony with 31% of households watching over a 58% share. Nevertheless, the ceremony presentation won an award for Outstanding Art Direction for a Variety Program (Roy Christopher) at the 33rd Primetime Emmys in September 1981.

See also
 List of submissions to the 53rd Academy Awards for Best Foreign Language Film

References

Bibliography

External links
 Academy Awards official website
 The Academy of Motion Picture Arts and Sciences official website
 Oscars' channel on YouTube run by the Academy of Motion Picture Arts and Sciences

Analysis
 1980 Academy Awards Winners and History Filmsite

Other resources
 

Academy Awards ceremonies
1980 film awards
1981 in Los Angeles
1981 in American cinema
March 1981 events in the United States
Academy
Television shows directed by Marty Pasetta
Attempted assassination of Ronald Reagan